Al Makhadir District is a district of Ibb Governorate, Yemen. As of 2003, the district had a population of 113,892 inhabitants.

References

Districts of Ibb Governorate
Al Makhadir District